Warden of the Dead (translit. Pazachyt na myrtvite) is a 2006 Bulgarian film directed by Ilian Simeonov. It was Bulgaria's submission to the 80th Academy Awards for the Academy Award for Best Foreign Language Film, but was not accepted as a nominee.

Cast
Vladimir Georgiev.....The Boy
Samuel Finzi.....Ivan
Itzhak Fintzi.....Angel
Diana Dobreva.....Maria
Nikolai Urumov.....Director of the Cemetery

Awards and nominations
Sofia International Film Festival
2007: Won, "Burgas Municipality Award 'Silver Sea-Gull'"

See also
List of submissions to the 80th Academy Awards for Best Foreign Language Film

References

External links

 

2006 films
2000s Bulgarian-language films
2006 drama films
Films shot in Bulgaria
Bulgarian drama films